Stoke-by-Nayland is a village and civil parish in the Babergh district, in the county of Suffolk, England, close to the border with Essex. The parish includes the village of Withermarsh Green and the hamlets of Thorington Street and Scotland Street. The village has many cottages and timber-framed houses and all surround a recreation field. Possibly once the site of a monastery, the population of the civil parish at the 2001 census was 703, falling to 682 at the Census 2011.

History
The village is first recorded in 946 in the will of Ælfgar, an Earl, where he endowed land to a community in the village, possibly a monastery.

St Mary's Church

The church was rebuilt in the 15th century and renovated in 1865, and appears several times in John Constable's paintings, though not always in the right place. The most notable feature is the red-brick tower; completed about 1470 and surmounted by stone spires, the buttresses are laced with canopied image niches. On the north side there is a Tudor porch, but the south porch, the main entrance, was entirely refaced by the Victorians. However, the windows and corbels reveal it to be one of the earliest parts of the church, an early 14th-century addition of two storeys to the building that was then replaced in the late 15th century. The tower is 126 feet (38 metres) high to the pinnacles.

Listed buildings
Stoke-by-Nayland's many listed buildings consist mainly of Grade II houses and cottages, mostly timber-framed and rendered with plain-tile roofs, although some are thatched or slated.

Thorington Hall, in a separate hamlet to the south-east of the village, is a 17th-century timber-framed and plastered house with much original detail. There are cross wings at the north-east and south-west ends, and a staircase wing rises to above eaves level on the south-east front. The north-east wing has a jettied gable on both fronts, carved bressummer and bargeboards. The south-west wing has an oriel window on the upper storey on the north-west side, on four shaped brackets. It also includes a jettied gable with carved bressummer and bargeboards. The windows are mostly mullioned and transomed casements with leaded lights, some with the original 17th-century fastenings. There are some original windows, blocked. On the south-east front includes a modern glazed door with an 18th-century door-case and a scroll pediment on brackets. There are two heavy chimney stacks, one finely done with 6 grouped octagonal shafts.

Downs Farmhouse, no longer used as such, dates from the early 16th century, with later extensions. It is timber-framed and rendered; with rear extensions partly faced in 19th-century red brick. Of two storeys and on a 3-cell plan, its roofs are plain-tiled with the original chimney-stack set externally on the rear wall of the hall, and a cross entry. The stack has been rebuilt in plain red brick.

Street House is in Church Street and has a plain-tile roof above timber-framed construction behind a render finish.

The Maltings, backing onto the churchyard, and the Old Guildhall, facing it across the road, each has exposed timber-framing and jettied fronts designed to be seen. Both these buildings are of four bays divided into tenements.

Historical writings
The village features in the 1868 National Gazetteer of Great Britain, volume 10, as: 
In 1870–72, John Marius Wilson's Imperial Gazetteer of England and Wales described the village as:

In 1887, John Bartholomew also wrote an entry on Stoke Nayland in the Gazetteer of the British Isles with a much shorter description:

Amenities
Stoke-by-Nayland contains two schools, one primary, Stoke by Nayland Church of England Primary School, and one independent school, OneSchool Global UK. The village hall was established in 1911 as the Stoke by Nayland Institute. Now a registered charity the hall is now a general meeting place and hosts variety of events. Stoke By Nayland Hotel Golf and Spa is home to a golf course with two 18 hole courses. The club hosts two international PGA Tour events; the Senior Tour since 2006 and the EuroPro Tour since 2004. James Andrews Golf School moved to Stoke by Nayland Hotel, Golf and Spa in 2018 https://www.jamesandrewsgolfschool.co.uk

Transport
The village is served by buses connecting it to Hadleigh, Polstead, Langham, Colchester, Ipswich, Sudbury, Leavenheath, and Great Horkesley.

Notable persons with connections to Stoke-by-Nayland

 William Songer, who travelled to Nelson, New Zealand on the Whitby as Captain Arthur Wakefield's servant in 1841, was born in the village of Stoke-by-Nayland, and suggested naming the township of  Stoke in New Zealand after his birthplace. (The name  "Nayland" also features prominently near New Zealand's Stoke.)

 Charles Torlesse (1825 – 14 November 1866) was born in Stoke-by-Nayland and worked as a prominent surveyor for the Canterbury Association in  Canterbury, New Zealand. He returned to England due to ill health and died in 1866. He is buried in Stoke-by-Nayland.
 Rowley Baronets: Rear-Admiral Sir Joshua Rowley, 1st Baronet (1 May 1734 – 26 February 1790) was a Royal Navy officer.
 Joshua Francis Rowley, local politician and public servant: born 31 December 1920; Deputy Secretary, National Trust 1952–55; succeeded 1962 as seventh Bt; chairman, West Suffolk County Council 1971–74; vice-chairman, Suffolk County Council 1974–76, chairman 1976–78; Vice Lord-Lieutenant of Suffolk 1973–78, Lord-Lieutenant 1978–94; married 1959 The Hon Celia Monckton (one daughter); died Hadleigh, Suffolk 21 February 1997.
 Charles Gerald Brocklebank fought in the First World War of 1914-1918, and was mentioned in despatches. He gained the rank of captain in the service of the Royal Engineers and won the award of the Médaille militaire. He also received the Military Cross (M.C.)
 Lady Anne Windsor married Henry Windsor, 5th Baron Windsor, son of Edward Windsor, 3rd Baron Windsor, and of Lady Katherine de Vere, daughter of John de Vere, 16th Earl of Oxford. Henry Lord Windsor died in 1605, aged 43. Lady Anne Windsor died in 1615 and is buried in St Mary's Church.

 Æthelflæd of Damerham: Æthelflæd (known as Æthelflæd of Damerham), the second wife of King Edmund I of England
  David Hicks, interior designer
 Ralph Agas (or Radulph Agas) (c. 1540 – 26 November 1621), English land-surveyor, was born at Stoke-by-Nayland, Suffolk, about 1540, and entered upon the practice of his profession in 1566.
 Edward Aggas (fl. 1564–1601)], bookseller, printer, translator, and son of Robert Aggas of Stoke-by-Nayland.
 Sir William Capell, son of John Capell, held the office of Alderman of London and the office of Lord Mayor of London from 1503 to 1504 and fron 1509 to 1510.
 Thomas St Lawrence, 11th Baron Howth (Earl of Howth) lived at Stoke-by-Nayland. He succeeded to the title of 11th Baron Howth in 1643.
 George Webb (cricketer, born 1857)
 Beryl Cook, OBE (1926 – 2008), English artist best known for her original and instantly recognisable paintings.

Pictures of Stoke by Nayland

References

External links

 Stoke-by-Nayland Parish Council
 A visit to the church

 
Villages in Suffolk
Civil parishes in Suffolk
Babergh District